The 1996–97 NBA season was the 76ers 48th season in the National Basketball Association, and 34th season in Philadelphia. This season is most memorable when the 76ers won the Draft Lottery, and selected point guard Allen Iverson out of Georgetown University with the first overall pick in the 1996 NBA draft. After two seasons at Georgetown, Iverson would quickly established himself as one of the premier point guards in the NBA. During the off-season, the Sixers signed free agents Don MacLean, Mark Davis, Lucious Harris, and Michael Cage. Under new head coach Johnny Davis, the Sixers played around .500 in November with a 7–8 start to the season. However, they struggled and lost 23 of their next 24 games, including 10 and 13-game losing streaks posted respectively, and held a 12–34 record at the All-Star break. The Sixers lost ten of their final eleven games, and finished sixth in the Atlantic Division with a 22–60 record.

Iverson had a successful rookie season, scoring 30 points in his NBA debut in a 111–103 home loss to the Milwaukee Bucks on November 1, 1996, and finishing the season averaging 23.5 points, 7.5 assists and 2.1 steals per game. He was named Rookie of the Year, and was a member of the NBA All-Rookie First Team, while also winning the MVP award in the Rookie Game during the All-Star Weekend in Cleveland. Iverson also set a rookie record of scoring 40 or more points in five consecutive games in April, plus scoring a season-high of 50 points in a game against the Cleveland Cavaliers on April 12, 1997, despite the Sixers losing all five of those games.

In addition, second-year star Jerry Stackhouse finished second on the team in scoring averaging 20.7 points per game, while Derrick Coleman averaged 18.1 points, 10.1 rebounds and 1.3 blocks per game, but only played 57 games due to a finger injury, and Clarence Weatherspoon provided the team with 12.2 points and 8.3 rebounds per game. Off the bench, MacLean contributed 10.9 points per game, but only played just 37 games due to a hip injury, while Davis provided with 8.5 points and 4.3 rebounds per game, and starting center Scott Williams averaged 5.8 points and 6.4 rebounds per game.

The team also moved into the new 20,000 plus seat CoreStates Center (now the Wells Fargo Center), after calling The Spectrum home from 1967 to 1996. Davis and General Manager Brad Greenberg were both fired after Iverson's first season with the club. Following the season, MacLean, Harris and Cage were all traded to the New Jersey Nets.

Offseason

NBA Draft

Roster

Regular season

Season standings

Record vs. opponents

Season schedule

Player stats
Note: GP= Games played; REB= Rebounds; AST= Assists; STL = Steals; BLK = Blocks; PTS = Points; AVG = Average

Award winners
 Allen Iverson, NBA Rookie of the Year Award
 Allen Iverson, NBA All-Rookie Team First Team

Transactions

References

 Philadelphia 76ers on Basketball Reference

Philadelphia
Philadelphia 76ers seasons
Philadelphia
Philadelphia